Obsessional jealousy is jealousy that is characterized by intrusive and excessive thoughts, and may be accompanied by compulsive checking of the partner. It is not classified as a mental disorder in the psychiatric manuals DSM or ICD, but it is mentioned as an example of how obsessive compulsive disorder can present itself.

Presentation
Its characteristics are:
Little resistance and distress associated with obsessional thoughts 
Anger specifically directed at spouse 
Jealousy evident only in a committed relationship 
Frequently monosymptomatic 
Frequently responds at lower doses of SSRI 
Rapid response in comparison with classical OCD

See also
 Pathological jealousy

References

Obsessive–compulsive disorder
Jealousy